The CORRECTIV (or CORRECT!V) is a German nonprofit investigative journalism newsroom whose stated goal is "to give citizens access to information."  
With about 20 staff members, CORRECT!V is the only nonpartisan, nonprofit investigative center in Germany.
CORRECT!V describes itself as an organization that is "one of the many answers to the media crisis." 
CORRECT!V releases its reports in English, German and Russian languages via its web site to media outlets throughout Europe and around the globe.

History
CORRECT!V was initiated in 2014 by the charitable organization "CORRECTIV – Recherchen für die Gesellschaft" ("CORRECTIV – Research for Society") based in Essen and has been supported by the Brost Foundation with a grant of €1 million per year for three years.

Organization
CORRECT!V is a member of the International Fact-Checking Network.

Funding
CORRECT!V is a nonprofit organization and exempt from taxation under German law. The funding comes entirely from charitable foundations as well as membership fees and donations from the users and readers. CORRECT!V does not depend on sales or advertising. All donations of more than €1000 are listed on the website. CORRECT!V is "nonprofit, independent and investigative".

Board of directors
David Schraven is the publisher and Simon Kretschmer the executive director.

Editorial stance
CORRECT!V wants "to make investigative and informative journalism affordable and accessible to media organizations throughout Germany."

Reports/Publications
CORRECT!V reported amongst other things on
  "The System of Putin" (Dirty Money and State Collapse)
  "TTIP - The Deal" (Investigative, Analytic, Interactive: All about the Free Trade)
 "Flight MH17" (Searching for the truth)
 "The Invisibles" (Hundreds of thousands live in Germany without papers)
 "Weisse Wölfe" (A graphic investigation into the Nazi underground)
 "Court Donations" (How Judges And Prosecutors Hand Out Millions Every Year With Almost No Oversight)
 "Mafia in Africa" (How the mafia infiltrates the African economy)
 "Mafia" (Stories about the Mafia: drugs, dirty money, murder and investigations)
 "Deadly Superbugs" (An investigation of one of the largest health risks of the next decades)
 "Football Doping" (Everything about Doping and Painkillers in Football)
 "Generation E" (The big migration from South to North)
 Couchsurfing
 "Business Cheats" (How Fraudsters Turn Forged Bonds Into Cash)
 "Das Olivenöl-Kartell" (The Olive-Oil-Cartell)
 "CumEx-Files"
 "Grand Theft Europe"

Flight MH17
CORRECT!V described the Flight MH17 as one of the greatest war crimes of modern times. Over several months it gathered facts, investigated in eastern Ukraine and Russia, and found witnesses to the missile launch, unveiled a clear chain of evidence that MH17 was downed by a BUK missile ground-launched by a unit of the 53rd Russian Air Defense Brigade from Kursk. The brigade unit operated in mid July on Ukrainian territory without displaying national emblems.

Awards

 2014: Journalist des Jahres in category "newcomer" for the team of Correctiv
 2015: Grimme Online Award for their investigation "MH17 – Die Suche nach der Wahrheit"
 2015: Deutscher Reporterpreis in category "innovation" for graphic feature "Weisse Wölfe" by David Schraven and Jan Feindt
 2015: Deutsch-Französischer journalism award for "MH17 – Die Suche nach der Wahrheit"
 2016: Deutscher Reporterpreis in category "innovation"
 2016: Journalist des Jahres in category "Team des Jahres" (Team of the year)
 2016: LeadAward in category Independent of the year
 2016: Axel Springer Preis in category "Investigation" for undercover-Feature "animal thieves"
 2016: Award "Innovation of the year" by Wirtschaftsjournalist magazine for developing the software CrowdNewsroom and the analysis of mutual banks "Sparkassen-Check"
 2016: Deutscher Reporterpreis in category "innovation"
 2017: ERM-Mediaaward for sustainable development. Award for Fabian Löhe and Annika Joeres for Correctiv
 2018: Deutsch-Französischer journalism award for the project "searise" by Annika Joeres and Simon Jockers for Correctiv
 2018: Dr.-Georg-Schreiber-Mediaaward
 2018: Journalistenaward by Apothekerstiftung Westfalen Lippe for reporting on "Alte Apotheke"
 2018: Otto-Brenner-Preis for journalism for the works "Er kommt am Abend" and "Vergewaltigt auf Europas Feldern" by Pascale Müller (Correctiv) and Stefania Prandi (BuzzFeed)
 2018: UmweltMedienpreis ny Deutschen Umwelthilfe for the project "Irrsinn der Agrarpolitik" by Justus von Daniels, Stefan Wehrmeyer and Annika Joeres for CORRECTIV
 2019: Nannen Preis in feature for article "Vergewaltigt auf Europas Feldern" by Pascale Müller (Correctiv) and Stefania Prandi (BuzzFeed)

References

Further reading

 

News agencies based in Germany
Online person databases
Organizations established in 2014
2014 establishments in Germany
Investigative journalism